Qəhrəmanlı is a village and municipality in the Barda Rayon of Azerbaijan. In 2008, it was said to have had a population of 472.

References

Populated places in Barda District